The Women's individual table tennis – Class 10 tournament at the 2012 Summer Paralympics in London took place from 30 August to 3 September 2012 at ExCeL Exhibition Centre.

In the preliminary stage, athletes competed in two groups of four. Top two in each group qualified for the semi-finals.

Results
All times are local (BST/UTC+1)

Finals

Preliminary round

Group A

30 August, 13:40

30 August, 13:40

31 August, 11:40

|31 August, 11:40

1 September, 09:40

1 September, 09:40

Group B

30 August, 13:40

30 August, 13:40

31 August, 11:40

|31 August, 11:40

1 September, 10:20

1 September, 10:20

References

WI09
Para